No. 132 (City of Bombay) Squadron RAF was a Royal Air Force Squadron formed to be a bomber unit in World War I and reformed as a fighter unit in World War II.

History

Formation and World War I
No. 132 Squadron Royal Flying Corps was formed on 1 March 1918 and became a unit of the Royal Air Force a month later, but it disbanded on 23 December 1918 without becoming operational.

Reformation in World War II
The squadron reformed in 1941 as a fighter unit equipped with Spitfires and then provided air defence from Peterhead, Scotland, and Southern England. It then moved to Normandy after the D-Day landings. It returned to England in September 1944 before moving to Vavuniya, Ceylon, in January 1945. It was then based in Hong Kong, and was disbanded on 15 April 1946. The Squadron was a mixed RAF squadron meaning its members were from all over the world: The Caribbean, Poland, Canada, New Zealand etc.

Aircraft operated

Combat

Pilots 
132 Squadron had a number of prestigious pilots, many of whom received the Distinguished Flying Cross. 

The commanding officers for the Squadron were: J.R Ritchie, F.F Colloredo-Mansfield, A.G Page, and K.L Charney.

Flight Commanders in the Squadron were: D. Fopp, G. StClair, B.Rein, H.L. Smith, H.E Walmsley, A.E Tomblin, R.L.F Day, J.D Carpenter, A. Hvinden, T. Johnson, M. Graham, H.C Prudman, and J.M Maynyard.

DFCs were awarded to: F.F Colloredo-Mansfield, H.E Walmsley, A.E Tomblin, A.G Page, D.J Hawkings, R.L.F Day, M. Graham, K.L Charney, and H.C Prudman.

A single Distinguished Flying Medal was awarded to F. Campbell.

Of the 130 pilots who served on the Squadron, 14 lost their lives and 4 went missing with unknown fates.

Combat roles 
The Sqn started as a fighter unit before transitioning to a Fighter-Bomber role to support the D-Day landings. They were the first Spitfire Sqn to carry a bomb load of 1000lbs per aircraft and dropped 110 tons of bombs during the course of the war. The Sqn claimed 29 victories over enemy aircraft with a further 15 probable destroyed. They also destroyed 253 transport ground vehicles, and 15 midget submarines - '...another of the Flight Commanders who was Norwegian by the name of Hvinden spotted these whilst on a routine patrol on the Normandy Beaches. They were obviously trying to attack our shipping forces lying off the beaches, but unfortunately for them 132 Squadron arrived on the scene' - A.G. Page.

Roll of Honour

References

External links

 History of No.'s 131–135 Squadrons at RAF Web
 132 Squadron history on the official RAF website
 132 Squadron bases

132
132
Military units and formations established in 1918
1918 establishments in the United Kingdom